The 2000–01 season of the División de Honor de Futsal is the 12th season of top-tier futsal in Spain.

Regular season

League table

Playoffs

Championship playoffs

Relegation playoff

 Foticos Zaragoza relegated to División de Plata.

 Café Candelas Lugo relegated to División de Plata.

Goalscorers

As day 30 of 30

See also
División de Honor de Futsal
Futsal in Spain

External links
2000–01 season at lnfs.es

2000 01
Spain
futsal